Laxmipur is a village in Koraput district in the Indian state of Odisha.

Demographics
As of 2011 India census, Laxmipur had a population of 3,292 in 768 households. Males constitute 52.85% of the population and females 47.14%. Laxmipur has an average literacy rate of 62.75%, lower than the national average of 74%, male literacy is 62.3%, and female literacy is 37.6%. In Laxmipur, 11.75% of the population is under 6 years of age.

References

Villages in Koraput district